Mitzpe, a Hebrew word meaning lookout, may refer to the following places in Israel:

Mitzpe Aviv
Mitzpe Dani
Mitzpe Dona Gracia
Mitzpe Eshtemoa
Mitzpe Hagit
Mitzpe Hila
Mitzpe Ilan
Mitzpe Kramim
Mitzpe Netofa
Mitzpe Ramon
Mitzpe Shalem
Mitzpe Yair
Mitzpe Yeriho
Mitzpe Yosef